Vyacheslav Alekseyevich Nikonov (born 5 June 1956) is a Russian political scientist. He is a grandson of Vyacheslav Molotov, prominent Bolshevik and Soviet foreign minister under Joseph Stalin, whom he was named after, and Polina Zhemchuzhina, a Soviet politician.

Nikonov graduated from the History Department of Moscow State University in 1978 and has been studying the history of the Republican Party in the United States after World War II. He has been involved in Soviet and Russian politics since the 1970s, first as a local Komsomol leader, later in the Communist Party of the Soviet Union, and as a member of Mikhail Gorbachev, Boris Yeltsin, and Vladimir Putin's staff. In 1993, Nikonov was elected to the State Duma. In 2005, he published an early biography of Molotov (in Russian). As a biographer of his own grandfather, Nikonov cannot be regarded as an objective source, and he personally recognized this fact in the interview. In the same interview, Nikonov stated to be proud that Molotov was a wise and coolly ruthless man, giving him the right to be listed together with Timur (by the words of Winston Churchill). In 2005–2007, he was a member of the Public Chamber of Russia. Since 2007, Nikonov has been heading the Russkiy Mir Foundation established by Putin to promote Russian language and culture internationally. Since 2011, Nikonov has been heading School of Public Administration at Moscow State University. In 2011, was once again elected to the State Duma, and became the Chairman of the Education Committee in 2013. In July 2012, Nikonov received an Honorary Doctorate of Letters from the University of Edinburgh, which has since been rescinded.

During the 2014 Winter Olympics, The Daily Show correspondent Jason Jones engaged Nikonov in a mock interview about Russia–United States relations.

On 24 March 2022, the United States Treasury sanctioned him in response to the 2022 Russian invasion of Ukraine.

References 

1956 births
Living people
Russian people of Ukrainian-Jewish descent
Russian political scientists
21st-century Russian politicians
Eighth convocation members of the State Duma (Russian Federation)
First convocation members of the State Duma (Russian Federation)
Historians of the United States
Members of the Civic Chamber of the Russian Federation

Seventh convocation members of the State Duma (Russian Federation)
Sixth convocation members of the State Duma (Russian Federation)
Russian individuals subject to the U.S. Department of the Treasury sanctions